5th parallel may refer to:

5th parallel north, a circle of latitude in the Northern Hemisphere
5th parallel south, a circle of latitude in the Southern Hemisphere
Consecutive fifths or parallel fifths, a term used in music